Deutsches Sportecho was an East German daily sports newspaper of the Deutscher Turn- und Sportbund (DTSB).

History
Deutsches Sportecho was first published on 5 May 1947. The paper had a circulation of 185,000 copies. The paper sponsored the association football competition DFV-Supercup (Pokal des Deutschen Sportechos) in 1989. The paper was published by the East German publishing house Sportverlag at the Neustädtische Kirchstraße 15 in Berlin. Sportverlag also published the weekly football paper Die neue Fußballwoche (FuWo) of the East German Football Association (DFV).
 
The paper was acquired by West German publishing group Axel Springer in 1990. The paper would now be published by Sportverlag GmbH. The circulation of  Deutsches Sportecho rapidly declined after the German reunification. The circulation had fallen to 34,000 copies by 1991. The paper subsequently ceased publication on 3 April 1991.

References

Sports newspapers
1947 establishments in Germany
1991 disestablishments in Germany
Sports mass media in Germany
Sports mass media in East Germany
German-language newspapers
Daily newspapers published in Germany
Defunct newspapers published in Germany
Mass media in East Germany
Sport in East Germany
Newspapers published in Berlin
Publications established in 1947
Publications disestablished in 1991